Lockenhaus is a town in the district of Oberpullendorf in the Austrian state of Burgenland. The town is well known for the annual Lockenhaus Chamber Music Festival founded by violinist Gidon Kremer.

History 
The town was (like the whole Burgenland until 1920/21) part of Hungary since the foundation of the kingdom in the year 1000. After World War I "Deutsch-Westungarn" (the Burgenland) became part of Austria when the Treaty of Trianon deprived Hungary of about 70% of the territory which it had held for more than nine centuries.

The actor Ludwig Stossel was born in Lockenhaus in 1883 and after emigrating to America appeared in a number of Hollywood films including Casablanca. Members of the Stossel family were part of a Jewish community in the village which existed until 1938. A memorial to those members of the Jewish community in Lockenhaus who were murdered in the Holocaust was unveiled in 2008.

Population

Sights
 Burg Lockenhaus
 Church of St. Nikolaus, Lockenhaus
 Lockenhaus Chamber Music Festival

References

Gallery 

Cities and towns in Oberpullendorf District